Greek Fire is a 1957 thriller novel by the British writer Winston Graham.

References

Bibliography
 David Roessel. In Byron's Shadow: Modern Greece in the English and American Imagination. Oxford University Press, 2001.

1957 British novels
Novels by Winston Graham
British thriller novels
Novels set in Greece
Hodder & Stoughton books